Charlton Eagle (born 30 November 1963) is a former professional tennis player from Australia.

Career
In 1987, Eagle qualified for his first Australian Open and faced American Marty Davis in the first round. Eagle lost in straight sets. His second and final Grand Slam appearance came at the 1988 Australian Open, where he was beaten in the opening round by sixth seed Anders Järryd.

Eagle's only win on the Grand Prix tour was over Britain's James Turner, at the 1987 Bristol Open. The highest ranked opponent that he had during his career was Boris Becker, who he played against at the 1988 Stella Artois Championships (Queen's).

Since retiring, Eagle has been involved coaching after retiring from the tour. He has coached the Australia Fed Cup team and was head coach of South Africa's tennis squad 2000 Sydney Olympics.

Personal
Born in Johannesburg, Eagle immigrated to Australia when he was 13.

Eagle, who played college tennis at Baylor University, now lives in Florida and represents the United States on the senior's tennis circuit.

Challenger titles

Doubles: (1)

References

1963 births
Living people
Australian male tennis players
Australian tennis coaches
South African emigrants to Australia
Australian expatriate sportspeople in the United States
Baylor Bears men's tennis players
20th-century Australian people
21st-century Australian people